Icelandic Glacial (stylized as ÍCELANDIC GLACIAL) is a brand of bottled spring water, taken from the Ölfus Spring in Iceland.

The Icelandic Glacial brand is owned and operated by Icelandic Water Holdings hf. based in Hlidarendi, Ölfus, Iceland. Icelandic Water Holdings controls the sole commercial rights to bottle and sell water from the Ölfus Spring. The capacity of the Spring is recognized as one of the largest in the world.

Icelandic Water Holdings was established in April 2004 by a group of private investors led by former media entrepreneur Jon Olafsson.  The company has been exporting Icelandic Glacial to consumers since 2005. In the United States, it is distributed by Anheuser-Busch Inbev, which took a 20% ownership stake in the company in July 2007. Since then, Icelandic Glacial distribution has expanded to other territories including Australia, the United Kingdom, Republic of Ireland, the Netherlands, France, Russia, Canada, Peru, Singapore, South Korea, and China.

Environmental record
In 2007, Icelandic Glacial received a Carbon Neutral certification for both product and operations from The Carbon Neutral Company. With the program developed with The Carbon Neutral Company Icelandic Glacial conducts an ongoing assessment of CO2 emissions and reduces emissions wherever possible. Any unavoidable remaining CO2 emissions are then offset by investing in accredited and bonafide projects around the world to reduce carbon emissions to a net-zero level. Icelandic Glacial offset project investments have included renewable energy projects in Europe, China and India.

Icelandic Glacial uses natural renewable energy in the form of geothermal power to fuel production. The company implements a shipping policy from its mid-Atlantic location that uses otherwise empty cargo slots for shipments of product to the US and mainland Europe. The bottles are 100% recyclable including the labels and the outer box packaging uses 75% post consumer recycled materials.

The source of Icelandic Glacial Water is the Ölfus Spring in Iceland, which has been deemed certifiably sustainable by Zenith International because it does not deplete or permanently damage its source.  The long term sustainability of the product (and of bottled water as a category) has been questioned, however.

References

External links
Icelandic Glacial official website
Anheuser-Busch website

Bottled water brands